Microphestia animalcula is a species of snout moth, and the only species in the genus Microphestia. The species and the genus were described by Harrison Gray Dyar Jr. in 1914. It is found in Panama.

References

Moths described in 1914
Phycitinae